The 1930 Washington and Lee Generals football team was an American football team that represented Washington and Lee University during the 1930 college football season as a member of the Southern Conference. In their second year under head coach Eugene Oberst, the team compiled an overall record of 3–6–1, with a mark of 0–4–1 in conference play, finishing in 22nd place in the SoCon.

Schedule

References

Washington and Lee
Washington and Lee Generals football seasons
Washington and Lee Generals football